What Am I Doing in the Middle of a Revolution? (also known as ¡Qué nos importa la revolución!) is a 1972 Spaghetti Western comedy film.

The title should be understood, according to the director Sergio Corbucci, as "What Am I Doing in the Middle of the Western Cinema?". It is the final chapter of the Corbucci's trilogy about the Mexican revolution, after The Mercenary and Compañeros. The film mixes comedy and political apologue.

Plot 
Padre Don Albino Moncalieri and his nemesis Guido Guidi are, by a series of accidents involved into Mexican revolution. The theatre company of Guido Guidi is hired by a certain Peppino Garibaldi, who seems to be a relative of famous Giuseppe Garibaldi. On tour throughout Mexico they get by accident entangled in revolutionary activities and experience the fog of war.

Cast 
 Vittorio Gassman as Guido Guidi
 Paolo Villaggio as Don Albino Moncalieri
 Riccardo Garrone as Peppino Garibaldi
 Eduardo Fajardo as Herrero
 Rosanna Yanni as Rosanna
 Leo Anchóriz as Carrasco

References

External links

1972 films
Spaghetti Western films
Commedia all'italiana
1970s Western (genre) comedy films
Films scored by Ennio Morricone
Films directed by Sergio Corbucci
Mexican Revolution films
Italian buddy comedy films
1970s buddy comedy films
Films shot in Almería
1972 comedy films
1970s Italian films